Serafin (Italian, Polish) or Serafín (Spanish) may refer to:

 Serafin (band), a London rock group
 Serafín (telenovela), a Mexican telenovela
 Serafin, Masovian Voivodeship in east-central Poland
 Catharina Serafin, a patient on whom the first studies of electrical pacing were performed
 Sanctus Seraphin (1699 – c. 1758), Italian luthier
 Tullio Serafin (1878–1968), Italian opera conductor

See also
 Séraphin (disambiguation)
 Seraph (disambiguation)